The 2010 Rally Sweden was the opening round of the 2010 World Rally Championship season. It was the season's first and only event held on snow- and ice-covered gravel roads. The rally was held over February 11–14, beginning with a Super Special Stage in the event's base town of Karlstad. The rally was also the first round of both the Production Car World Rally Championship, and the brand-new Super 2000 World Rally Championship.

The rally was the first to incorporate the new points system introduced to all classes for the 2010 season. The system sees 25 points awarded for first, 18 for second, with third receiving 15, 12 for fourth and then ten, eight, six, four, two, and one for tenth place.

Mikko Hirvonen won the rally, taking the twelfth win of his career. Hirvonen took six stage wins over the course of the rally, leading overall from Stage 5 onwards. Reigning world champion Sébastien Loeb finished second, some 42 seconds behind the Finn, with Hirvonen's teammate Jari-Matti Latvala completing the podium in third place. Further back, Marcus Grönholm returned to a WRC event, but finished outside of the points in 21st position.  Formula One world champion Kimi Räikkönen made his second start in a WRC rally, and his first at the wheel of a contemporary World Rally Car. Räikkönen lost over half an hour to the leading drivers when his car got stuck in an area of soft snow, and was forced to dig himself out on day one. He never recovered the time lost and finished 29th overall.

In the inaugural SWRC event, Per-Gunnar Andersson held off the challenges of Janne Tuohino and Martin Prokop to win the rally. Prokop also earned an overall stage win, when he completed the second run through the Hagfors Sprint stage in the fastest time. In the PWRC, Patrik Flodin won by over a minute from Anders Grøndal, with Armindo Araújo over five minutes behind the Swede in third.

Results

Event standings

Special stages

Standings after the rally

Standings

Drivers' championship

Manufacturers' championship

SWRC Drivers' championship

WRC Cup for Super 2000 Teams championship

PWRC Drivers' championship

References

External links 
 Results at eWRC.com

Sweden
Swedish Rally
Rally